Parked is a 2011 Irish drama film written by Ciaran Creagh and directed by Darragh Byrne about homelessness, friendship, and the will to survive adversity, whilst still retaining poise. It premiered at the 2010 Torino Film Festival

Plot
Having returned from the UK to his native Ireland, middle-aged Fred (Colm Meaney) lives an isolated life in his car, caught in a bureaucratic trap: Without social benefits he cannot afford to rent a room and without a permanent address, he is not entitled to social benefits. That all changes when he forms an unlikely friendship with Cathal (Colin Morgan), a dope-smoking 21-year-old with a positive attitude, who becomes his 'neighbour.' Sharing laughs and the hard times too, Fred and Cathal find some simple, free pleasures of life.

Cathal is determined to make Fred sort out his life and it works. Fred modifies his car, beats the system and makes a friend in Jules, an attractive music teacher who lives alone nearby. But Fred struggles with his pride to tell Jules about his 'home' and Cathal’s life is threatened by his escalating drug habit.

Fred's trust in Cathal is soon thwarted when he discovered Cathal injecting drugs into the veins of his feet. Cathal had sworn he had never injected, even showing Fred his arms as proof. Fred shouts at Cathal and then storms away to see Jules. While Fred is gone, Cathal is attacked by his drug dealer. Beaten and exhausted, Cathal breaks into his dad's house, begging for money. His dad refuses to pay, and Cathal leaves. He then shows up at a bonfire with other drug addicts. They steal his shoes in exchange for a needle. Cathal injects himself in the arm and passes out.

Fred returns to find Cathal's car trashed and his treasured watch broken. He searches everywhere for Cathal, and eventually finds him in the mortuary. Cathal has died, but not before succeeding in improving Fred's life. Jules knows about Fred living in a car, and Fred is on the way to having a place of his own thanks to Cathal's persuasion. In the end, Cathal still managed to save Fred, though he couldn't do the same for himself.

Reception

Critical response

On Rotten Tomatoes, Parked has an approval rating of 64% based on 14 reviews, with an average rating of 5.1/10. On Metacritic, another review aggregator, the film has a score of 47 out of 100 based on 8 critics, indicating "mixed or average reviews".

Cast
 Colm Meaney as Fred Daly
A man who returns to Dublin and has nowhere to live but his car, after working in England for years.
 Colin Morgan as Cathal O'Regan
A friendly young man who is a homeless drug addict, but becomes Fred's closest friend.
 Milka Ahlroth as Juliana (Jules)
An attractive Finnish music teacher and widow, whom Fred is attracted to.
 Stuart Graham as George O'Regan
A distant father who blames his son Cathal for his wife's death.
 Michael McElhatton as Frank
A drug dealer who is determined to get paid, no matter the means.

Festivals
 Mosaico European Film Festival 2011
 Irish Film Festa Rome 2011
 Tallinn Black Nights Film Festival 2011
 Scanorama European Film Forum 2011
 Mannheim-Heidelberg International Film Festival 2011
 Busan International Film Festival 2011
 San Francisco Irish Film Festival 2011
 Irish Film New York 2011
 Helsinki International Film Festival Love & Anarchy 2011
 International Golden Boll Film Festival 2011
 Galway Film Festival
 Brussels Film Festival (BRFF) 2011
 Newport Beach Film Festival 2011
 Dallas International Film Festival 2011
 Irish Film Festival Boston 2011
 International Film Festival Rotterdam 2011
 Göteborg International Film Festival 2011
 Torino Film Festival 2010

Awards and nominations

References

External links

2011 films
2011 drama films
Irish drama films
Films about homelessness
Films set in Dublin (city)
Films shot in Dublin (city)